Don Ricardo Returns is a 1946 American western drama film.  After having been abducted and sent away on a ship in 1835, Don Ricardo (Coby) escapes and makes his way back to Alta California. He returns to exact revenge on those who kidnapped him and stole his land.

Cast
Fred Coby – Don Ricardo
Martin Garralaga – Miguel Porcoreno
Fred Coby – Don Luera
Lita Baron (billed as Isabella) – Dorotea
Michael Visaroff – Captain Martinez
Paul Newlan as Lugo the Huge

References

External links
 
 
 
 

1946 films
1946 Western (genre) films
American black-and-white films
American swashbuckler films
Producers Releasing Corporation films
Films set in Mexico
Films set in the 1830s
1940s historical drama films
American historical drama films
Films directed by Terry O. Morse
American Western (genre) films
1946 drama films
Films based on works by Johnston McCulley
1940s English-language films
1940s American films